Bakans ( or Bakans) is a lake in Madona municipality, Latvia. It is located near to Dzelzava village and next to the lake is a smaller village, named Jaunbakani.

In the 1930s, an old lake settlement was found in the lake.

Lakes of Latvia